Mandeep Singh (born 18 December 1991) is an Indian cricketer. He plays for Punjab in the top-flight of Indian cricket. A right-hand batsman who also occasionally bowls right arm medium pace, Mandeep has also played for India Blue, and North Zone and for teams in the Indian Premier League. He was the vice-captain of the India under-19 cricket team for the 2010 ICC Under-19 Cricket World Cup.

On 18 July 2012, he was included in 30 probables for the World T20 tournament to be played in Sri Lanka in September 2012. However, he was not selected in the final 15-member squad.

He made his Twenty20 International (T20I) debut against Zimbabwe at Harare Sports Club on 18 June 2016.

Domestic career
Mandeep plays for Punjab in Ranji Trophy & Vijay Hazare Trophy and for North Zone in Zonal Tournament.

In the 2012 season of IPL, Mandeep scored 432 runs from 16 matches, including two half-centuries, and ended the tournament as Kings XI Punjab's leading run-scorer. He was also adjudged the winner of "Rising Star of the tournament Award".

He was the highest run scorer in 2015 Vijay Hazare Trophy. On the back of his form in the tournament, he was selected for 2015 tour of Zimbabwe.

In January 2018, he was bought by the Royal Challengers Bangalore in the 2018 IPL auction. In 2019, he was again bought by Kings XI Punjab and he was retained by the team for IPL 2021 after recently concluded IPL 2020. In February 2022, he was bought by the Delhi Capitals in the auction for the 2022 Indian Premier League tournament.

He was one of the most consistent run scorers in latest editions of Ranji Trophy after missing 2017–18 season. He scored 602 runs in 2018–19, 696 runs in 2019–20, 376 runs in 2021–22 and 463 runs in 2022–23. He averaged more than 50 in each year with cumulative average of 64.76 in this period. Despite this golden patch in his peak age, he was never called up to India national cricket team or called back to India A cricket team.

Personal life
Mandeep Singh's father was an athletics coach in Jalandhar. He was initially not happy with his son's cricketing ambition but was later satisfied when saw his son's cricketing potential. He married Jagdeep Jaswal in 2016. Their son Rajveer Singh was born on 16 January 2021.

References

External links

1991 births
Living people
Indian cricketers
India Twenty20 International cricketers
Punjab, India cricketers
North Zone cricketers
India Blue cricketers
Kolkata Knight Riders cricketers
Punjab Kings cricketers
Royal Challengers Bangalore cricketers
Delhi Capitals cricketers